Jind Junction railway station is located in Jind district in the Indian state of Haryana and serves  Jind .

The railway station

History

The Southern Punjab Railway Co. opened the Delhi–Bhatinda–Samasatta line in 1897. The line passed through Muktasar and Fazilka tehsils and provided direct connection through Samma Satta (now in Pakistan) to Karachi.

Electrification
The electrification of the Rohtak–Bathinda–Lehra Muhabat sector is completed in 2018–19.

Tracks
Delhi–Jakhal–Bhatinda section is now double electric line.

References

External links
Trains at Jind

Railway stations in Jind district
Delhi railway division
Railway junction stations in Haryana
Transport in Jind